Amy Weiss is an American Reform rabbi, and the founder and executive director of the Houston-based non-profit Undies for Everyone (UFE).

Weiss got the idea for UFE in 2008 when a social worker expressed to her the need that disadvantaged youth had for underwear. A blogger for the Houston Chronicle at the time, Weiss wrote a post calling for underwear donations and founded UFE due to the overwhelming reader response. UFE became a nonprofit organization in 2012.

Weiss attended the Rice University Leadership Institute for Non-Profit Executives while serving as resident chef for Houston Hillel. she was chair of a panel of the Houston Police Independent Oversight Board. She also served as a member of the TIRR Memorial Hermann ethics committee.

Weiss was named a CNN Hero in June 2022. She is married to Rabbi Kenny Weiss, executive director of Houston Hillel.

Education 
Weiss grew up in Dallas, Texas and graduated from the University of Texas with a Bachelor of Science in 1983. She received a Master of Arts from the Hebrew Union College-Jewish Institute of Religion in 1991, a Master of Arts in Hebrew Literature from HUC-JIR in 1994, and was ordained at HUC-JIR in 1995.

References 

Living people
American Reform rabbis
Reform women rabbis
Year of birth missing (living people)
Place of birth missing (living people)
University of Texas at Austin alumni
21st-century American Jews